Raiganj Assembly constituency is an assembly constituency in Uttar Dinajpur district in the Indian state of West Bengal.

Overview
As per orders of the Delimitation Commission, No. 35 Raiganj Assembly constituency covers Raiganj municipality, and Bahin, Maraikup, Gouri, Kamalabati I and Kamalabati II gram panchayats of Raiganj community development block.

Raiganj Assembly constituency is part of No. 5 Raiganj (Lok Sabha constituency).

Members of Legislative Assembly

Election results

2021
In the 2021 election, Krishna Kalyani of BJP defeated his nearest rival Kanaia Lal Agarwal of AITC.

2016
In the 2016 election, Mohit Sengupta of INC defeated his nearest rival Purnendu Dey of AITC.

2011
In the 2011 election, Mohit Sengupta of Congress defeated his nearest rival Kiranmoy Nanda of Samajwadi Party.

2006
In the 2006 election, Chittaranjan Roy of Indian National Congress defeated his nearest rival Dilip Kumar Das of Nationalist Congress Party.

 

.# Swing calculated on CPIM+NCP vote percentages taken together in 2006.

1977–2006
In the 2006 and 2001 state assembly elections Chittaranjan Roy of Congress won the 35 Raiganj Assembly seat defeating his nearest rivals Dilip Kumar Das of NCP and Harinarayan Roy of CPI(M) respectively. Contests in most years were multi cornered but only winners and runners are being mentioned. Dilip Kumar Das of Congress defeated Khagendra Nath Sinha of CPI(M) in 1996. Khagendra Nath Sinha of CPI(M) defeated Dilip Das of Congress in 1991 and Dipendra Barman of Congress in 1987. Dipendra Barman of Congress defeated Khagendra Nath Sinha of CPI(M) in 1982. Khagendra Nath Sinha of CPI(M) defeated Mahendranath Barman of Janata Party in 1977.

1951–1972
Ramendranath Dutta of Congress won in 1972 and 1971. Manash Roy of CPI(M) won in 1969. N.N.Kundu of PSP won in 1967. Ramendranath Dutta of Congress won in 1962. In 1957 and 1951 Raiganj was a joint seat. Hazi Badirudddin Ahmad and Syama Prasad Barman, both of Congress, won in 1957. Syama Prasad Barman and Gulam Hamidur Rahman, both of Congress, won in 1951.

References

Assembly constituencies of West Bengal
Politics of Uttar Dinajpur district